Dorothy Roberts (née Blackie; born 18 February 1967) is a retired British rower. She competed at the 1992 Summer Olympics, 1996 Summer Olympics and the 2000 Summer Olympics.

Roberts is Pathway and Performance Manager for Scottish Swimming and a member of the Scottish Rowing Board of Directors serving as the Director of Performance.

References

External links
 

1967 births
Living people
British female rowers
Olympic rowers of Great Britain
Rowers at the 1992 Summer Olympics
Rowers at the 1996 Summer Olympics
Rowers at the 2000 Summer Olympics
Sportspeople from St Andrews